Michael Brian McCarthy (born June 20, 1968) is a retired American road and track cyclist who was active between 1986 and 1998. On track, he won one gold and one bronze medals in the individual pursuit at the world championships in 1990 and 1992. He competed at the 1988 and 1996 Summer Olympics in the 4 km team pursuit and finished in ninth and sixth place, respectively. On the road, he won two stages of the Redlands Bicycle Classic (1995, 1997), Tour de Taiwan (2×1995) and Tour of Japan (2×1998).

In 1990, McCarthy was selected as USA Cycling Athlete of the Year. In 2010, he was inducted to the United States Bicycling Hall of Fame.

Born and raised in New York, he then moved to Mill Valley, California, and started racing competitively in 1982. He retired due to an Epstein–Barr virus infection and later worked as a sales trader in San Francisco.

References

1968 births
Living people
American male cyclists
Olympic cyclists of the United States
Cyclists at the 1988 Summer Olympics
Cyclists at the 1996 Summer Olympics
UCI Track Cycling World Champions (men)
Pan American Games gold medalists for the United States
Pan American Games medalists in cycling
American track cyclists
Cyclists at the 1987 Pan American Games
Medalists at the 1987 Pan American Games